Tim Rother (born September 28, 1965) is a former American football defensive tackle. He played for the Los Angeles Raiders from 1989 to 1990.

References

1965 births
Living people
American football defensive tackles
Nebraska Cornhuskers football players
Los Angeles Raiders players